Phạm Phước Hưng, born 16 June 1988, is a Vietnamese artistic gymnast from Ha Noi. In 2012 he became the first gymnast to win a gold medal for Vietnam at World Challenge Cup, winning at the 2012 Artistic Gymnastics FIG World Cup in Ghent, Belgium.  He qualified to represent Vietnam at the 2012 and 2016 Olympics.

References

External links
 

1988 births
Living people
Vietnamese male artistic gymnasts
Gymnasts at the 2012 Summer Olympics
Gymnasts at the 2016 Summer Olympics
Olympic gymnasts of Vietnam
Gymnasts at the 2010 Asian Games
Gymnasts at the 2014 Asian Games
Gymnasts at the 2018 Asian Games
Sportspeople from Hanoi
Southeast Asian Games gold medalists for Vietnam
Southeast Asian Games silver medalists for Vietnam
Southeast Asian Games bronze medalists for Vietnam
Southeast Asian Games medalists in gymnastics
Competitors at the 2005 Southeast Asian Games
Competitors at the 2007 Southeast Asian Games
Competitors at the 2011 Southeast Asian Games
Competitors at the 2015 Southeast Asian Games
Asian Games competitors for Vietnam
20th-century Vietnamese people
21st-century Vietnamese people